Sport Vereniging Estrella is an Aruban football club, which currently plays in Aruba's first division. They are based in Papilon, Santa Cruz. The team is one of the most successful in Aruban football, and they are one of the two Aruban teams that won the Netherlands Antilles Championship.

Achievements
Aruban Division di Honor: 12
 1968, 1973, 1977, 1985, 1988, 1989, 1990, 1992, 1996, 1998, 1999, 2006

Netherlands Antilles Championship: 1
 1970

Performance in CONCACAF competitions
CONCACAF Champions' Cup: 1 appearance
1971 – Final Round (CONCACAF Series) – (6th placed in Final Group – 0 pts), (stage 2 of 2)

Staff and board members

 President:  Lorenzo Werleman
 Other Board Members:  Clyde Croes, Herlando Everon, Derrick Franken, Lindomar Kock, Joanne Oduber, Naika Weller

External links
 SV Estrella Futbol 
 Website 

Football clubs in Aruba
Football clubs in the Netherlands Antilles
Association football clubs established in 1948
1948 establishments in Aruba